The Best of Red Hot Chili Peppers (also titled Greatest Hits on some versions) is a compilation album by the Red Hot Chili Peppers, first released in 1994, containing tracks from the band's time signed to the EMI America record label. What Hits!? has all these songs and 8 more. This compilation has been reprinted at least 4 times from 1994 to 2005 with different cover art.

Track listing

References

1998 greatest hits albums
Red Hot Chili Peppers compilation albums
Capitol Records compilation albums